Baar di boli (Punjabi: ਬਾਰ ਦੀ ਬੋਲੀ, بار دی بولی) is a dialect of Punjabi language spoken in Hafizabad and Nankana Sahib districts.

References

Punjabi dialects